Muchesh District is a district (bakhsh) in Kamyaran County, Kurdistan Province, Iran. At the 2006 census, its population was 30,884, in 7,443 families.  The District has one city: Muchesh. The District has four rural districts (dehestan): Amirabad Rural District, Avalan Rural District, Gavrud Rural District, and Sursur Rural District.

References 

Kamyaran County
Districts of Kurdistan Province